The 2014 Tandridge District Council election took place on 22 May 2014 to elect members of Tandridge District Council in Surrey, England. One third of the council was up for election and the Conservative Party stayed in overall control of the council.

After the election, the composition of the council was:
Conservative 34
Liberal Democrats 6
Independent 2

Election result
There was no change in the party composition of the council, with the Conservatives holding all 13 seats they had been defending, while the Liberal Democrats held the other seat contested in Warlingham East, Chelsham and Farleigh. This left the Conservatives with 34 councillors, compared to 6 for the Liberal Democrats and 2 independents. Overall turnout at the election was 42.57%.

The UK Independence Party failed to win any seats, but came second in 10 of the 14 seats contested. They reduced the Conservative majority in many of the wards, coming closest to taking a seat in Godstone, which was held by the Conservatives with a majority of 68 votes. There was only one new councillor elected, with Maureen Young holding the Conservative seat in Dormansland and Felcourt that had been held by fellow Conservative Michael Sydney before he stood down at the election.

Ward results

By-elections between 2014 and 2015
A by-election was held in Whyteleafe on 1 April 2015 following the disqualification of Conservative Cllr Tom Dempsey for not attending any meetings of the council in six months.

David Lee gained the seat for the Liberal Democrats.

References

2014 English local elections
Tandridge District Council elections
2010s in Surrey